The Men's 5 km competition of the 2014 European Aquatics Championships was held on 13 August. The time trial format was used, swimmers started at 1-minute intervals from each other and raced against the clock.

Results
The race was started at 13:30.

References

2014 European Aquatics Championships
European Aquatics Championships